Stewarts Creek is a  long 4th order tributary to the Ararat River in Surry County, North Carolina.

Variant names
According to the Geographic Names Information System, it has also been known historically as:
Bledsoe Creek
Stewart Creek
Stuarts Creek

Course
Stewarts Creek originates at the confluence of North and South Fork about 4 miles southwest of Pipers Gap in Carroll County, Virginia.  Stewarts Creek then flows southeast into Surry County, North Carolina to join the Ararat River at Mount Airy.

Watershed
Stewarts Creek drains  of area, receives about 49.5 in/year of precipitation, has a wetness index of 333.21, and is about 57% forested.

See also
List of rivers of North Carolina

References

Rivers of North Carolina
Rivers of Virginia
Rivers of Surry County, North Carolina
Rivers of Carroll County, Virginia